Spread the Word: Inclusion is a global campaign working towards inclusion for all people with intellectual and developmental disabilities. It started as Spread the Word to End the Word, a US campaign to encourage people to pledge to stop using the words "retard" and "retarded", but broadened both its goals and its scope in 2019.

History
The Spread the Word to End the Word movement was established in 2009 during the Special Olympics Global Youth Activation Summit at the 2009 Special Olympics World Winter Games. The Spread the Word to End the Word movement was created by youth with and without intellectual disabilities.  According to the Special Olympics:
“The motivation for the campaign was driven by a united passion to promote the positive contributions people with intellectual disabilities make to communities around the world combined with a simple call to action that also symbolizes positive attitude change and a commitment to make the world a more accepting place for all people.”

On March 31, 2009 the campaign celebrated the 1st Annual Spread the Word to End the Word National Awareness Day. Across the country, students of all ages made a pledge to eliminate "retard" from their vocabulary and encourage others to do the same. In 2010, the 2nd Annual Spread the Word to End the Word National Day of Awareness took place on March 3, 2010.

In January 2010, the news of the past summer use of "retards" by White House chief of staff Rahm Emanuel to describe liberal groups planning attack ads on Democrats was reported in the Wall Street Journal. This led to Emanuel's apologizing to Tim Shriver, chief executive of the Special Olympics.  A meeting was held with Emanuel, who was asked to visit www.r-word.org, and he promised to take the R-word pledge.

In 2019, Spread the Word to End the Word renamed themselves into Spread the Word, and extended its focus to inclusion for all people with intellectual and developmental disabilities.

References

External links
 Spread the Word: Inclusion
 Special Olympics - Spread the Word to End the Word

Political advocacy groups in the United States
Ableism
Anti-bullying campaigns
Linguistic controversies
2009 establishments in the United States